Eleni Aklillu is an Ethiopian senior research scientist and research group leader at the Karolinska Institute. She is also a professor of tropical pharmacology at the same institute. She is a Fellow of The Royal College of Physicians Edinburgh (FRCPEdin), and a Fellow of the African Academy of Sciences and the laureate of the Donald Mackay Medal.

Biography

Education
In 1987, Aklillu received a Bachelor of Pharmacy from Addis Ababa University in Ethiopia. She earned a Master of Science in Biochemistry from the same university in 1996. She went on to obtain a Doctorate of Philosophy degree in Molecular genetics from the Karolinska Institute in Stockholm, Sweden, in 2003.

Career
In 2009, she became an associate professor of pharmacology at the Karolinska Institute. Since 2020, she has been a full professor of tropical pharmacology specializing in the area of pharmacogenomics at the same institute. Aklillu is also a senior researcher and research group leader at the Department of Laboratory Medicine within the Karolinska Institute.

Research
Aklillu's main area of research is Tropical Pharmacology, which is clinical pharmacology research with focus on major infectious diseases that are classified as public health problems, the largest global burden, and the leading cause of death/disability, particularly in low and middle-income countries. Her areas of research include: optimization of treatments and prevention of HIV/AIDS, Tuberculosis, Malaria, and Neglected tropical diseases such as schistosomiasis, lymphatic filariasis, and Soil transmitted helminths that required Mass drug administration for the control and prevention of theses diseases. Her research group has conducted several prospective observational studies, randomized clinical trials, drug interaction and dose optimization studies in various countries of sub Saharan Africa.

Distinctions
African Academy of Sciences - Fellow
European and Developing Countries Clinical Trials Partnership, Strategic Advisory Committee - Former Vice-Chair
Royal College of Physicians of Edinburgh - Fellow
Swedish Research Council, Advisory Committee - Board Member

Awards
2020 Donald Mackay Medal - "for outstanding work in tropical health."

Publications
She has over 170 publications. Her most cited work has been cited over 800 times.

References

Ethiopian scientists
Women pharmacologists
Addis Ababa University alumni
Karolinska Institute alumni
Academic staff of the Karolinska Institute
Living people
20th-century Ethiopian women
21st-century Ethiopian women
Year of birth missing (living people)
Fellows of the African Academy of Sciences